Palm heart can refer to

 palmier, a French pastry in a palm leaf shape
 heart of palm, a vegetable harvested from the inner core and growing bud of certain palm trees